Lorlie is a hamlet in Saskatchewan.

Levi Walter Aldous, a Canadian soldier who fought in the Battle Of Vimy Ridge was born in Lorlie in 1896.

References

Abernethy No. 186, Saskatchewan
Unincorporated communities in Saskatchewan
Division No. 6, Saskatchewan